Big K may refer to:

 Kuhn's-Big K, southeast American department store chain, sold out to Wal-Mart in 1981
 A larger store format of Kmart
 A store brand used by Kroger (and subsidiaries) for soft drinks
 Big K (magazine), a national UK computer magazine in the 1980s
 A nickname for the International Prototype of the Kilogram